Prolegomenon (usually plural prolegomena) is an Ancient Greek word used to mean "prologue" or "introduction", to introduce a larger work, e.g., a book.

Prolegomena may specifically refer to:
Prolegomena to Any Future Metaphysics by Immanuel Kant
Prolegomena to a Theory of Language by Louis Hjelmslev
Ibn Khaldun's Prolegomena, or Muqaddimah, an early Islamic treatise on world history, by Ibn Khaldun
Prolegomena zur Geschichte Israels (Prolegomena to the History of Israel), a book by German biblical scholar Julius Wellhausen
"Prolegomenon", a 2006 episode of the animated television series 12 oz. Mouse